The 1979 Cork Senior Football Championship was the 91st staging of the Cork Senior Football Championship since its establishment by the Cork County Board in 1887. The championship began on 11 April 1979 and ended on 21 October 1979.

Nemo Rangers entered the championship as the defending champions, however, they were defeated by Castlehaven at the semi-final stage.

On 21 October 1979, St. Finbarr's won the championship following a 3-14 to 2-07 defeat of Castlehaven in the final. This was their fifth championship title overall and their first title since 1976.

Castlehaven's T. J. O'Regan was the championship's top scorer with 2-23.

Team changes

To Championship

Promoted from the Cork Intermediate Football Championship
 Castlehaven

Results

Division 1

Division 2

Division 3

Division 4

Quarter-finals

Semi-finals

Final

Championship statistics

Top scorers

Overall

Miscellaneous
 Castlehaven make their first appearance at senior level. 
 Castlehaven qualified for the final for the first time in their history.

References

Cork Senior Football Championship